Pierolapithecus catalaunicus is an extinct species of primate which lived about 13 million years ago during the Miocene in what is now Hostalets de Pierola, Catalonia, Spain, giving it its scientific name. Some researchers believe Pierolapithecus is a candidate for common ancestor of both modern humans and the other great apes, or is at least a species that is closer to a common ancestor than any previous fossil discovery.

The species was described by a team of Spanish paleoanthropologists led by Salvador Moyà-Solà on the basis of a fossil specimen discovered in December 2002. The finding was first reported in the journal Science on November 19, 2004.

As do humans and other great apes, Pierolapithecus had specialized adaptations for tree climbing: a wide, flat ribcage, a stiff lower spine, flexible wrists, and shoulder blades that lay along its back. It  also has plesiomorphic  monkey-like features such as a sloped face and short fingers and toes. (gibbons and Old World monkeys  show more generalized characteristics.)

That Pierolapithecus would be ancestral to modern great apes is debated largely because this great ape was found in the Iberian Peninsula, while most of the fossil evidence of the evolution of hominids and hominins has been located in East Africa and Southeast Asia. Because, however, the Mediterranean Sea contracted several times in the past, permitting migration of terrestrial fauna between Africa and Europe, it is possible that Pierolapithecus, or its descendants, could have lived on both continents.

Rather than a full common ancestor, it has been suggested that the species may be ancestral to humans, chimpanzees and gorillas but not orangutans, given certain characteristics of the face.

See also

References

External links 

 BBC news: 'Original' great ape discovered
 Research article and comments

Prehistoric mammals of Europe
Prehistoric apes
Miocene primates of Europe
Transitional fossils
Fossil taxa described in 2004
Prehistoric primate genera